Kiwwada Nahi Nokiwwada Nahi is a 2011 Sri Lankan Sinhala comedy action film directed by Srilal Priyadeva and produced by Janitha Marasinghe for Janitha Films. It stars Ranjan Ramanayake, Tennyson Cooray, and Arjuna Kamalanath in lead roles along with Ananda Wickramage and Rex Kodippili. It is the 1162nd Sri Lankan film in the Sinhala cinema. This is brought debut cinema acting for Menaka Pieris. The film has influenced by 2008 Bollywood comedy film Golmaal Returns.

Plot

Cast
 Ranjan Ramanayake as Kalana
 Tennyson Cooray as Sanath Perera
 Arjuna Kamalanath as Ronnie Wickramasinghe
 Ananda Wickramage as Dharme ayya
 Rex Kodippili as Ronnie's father
 Menaka Peiris as Kanchanamala
 Eardley Wedamuni as Parippu Some
 Teddy Vidyalankara as Headmaster
 Tyrone Michael as Kaluwa
 Jeevan Handunnetti as Postman
 Nandana Hettiarachchi as Somasundaram
 D.B. Gangodathenna as Somasundaram's father
 Chanchala Warnasuriya as Chamali, Sanath's wife
 Chathura Perera as Somasundaram's henchman
 Hemantha Iriyagama as Matchmaker

References

2011 films
2010s Sinhala-language films